Snina is a town in Slovakia located at the confluence of the Cirocha river and the small river Pčolinka in the valley between the Bukovec Mountains foothills and the Vihorlat Mountains. It is the closest town with rail and bus connections to Poloniny National Park.

History

The oldest written records mentioning Snina date back to 1317. Snina as an oppidum (small town) is mentioned in  port records ("porta" means the gate into a courtyard) beginning in 1585. In 1598 the first census of houses was made and there were 75 houses in the town at that time. Between 1570 and 1630, it is evident from port records that Snina was the seat of the regional krajňa, or administrative district for the surrounding villages. In 1646 Snina was called "Szinna Varossa" and later "Civitas Szinna" in the archives. In 1785 Snina had 195 houses and 1,430 inhabitants.

The town's rulers from 1321 to 1684 were from the Drugeth family, who came from Salerno near Naples. Later, the owner of the lordship of Snina was Terézia van Dernáthová, who was the granddaughter of Žigmung Drugeth. After her death in 1799, her five sons sold all the property to a businessman from Gemer named Jozef Rholl. His children developed the region until 1857. They built an iron and steel works in the Jozef valley in 1809.

Starting in 1839 a traditional market took place in Snina four times a year, which aided the development of business and trade. An iron foundry was built in the Jozef valley in 1841. A well-known moulded statue of Hercules was placed next to the Snina manor-house and is the emblem of Snina to this day. During a decline in business in 1873, the iron and steel works completely vanished, so life for the citizens of Snina and its vicinity worsened rapidly and large-scale migration began. They left their homes and went to the United States, Canada and western Europe.

In 1876 Snina was a residence of the 10th region of the Zemplín area. The Roman Catholic classicist church from 1751 was modified at the beginning of the 19th century. A classicist Calvary in the cemetery dates from 1847, and features the Chapel of Virgin Mary. There is a manor-house from 1800 in the town set in a planned historical park, which is from the 19th century. In the courtyard of the manor-house is a public fountain with a well-known statue of Hercules from 1841. In the church's park there are monuments from World War II. There are also two military cemeteries from World War I near the town (Giglov has 130 graves of soldiers and Brehy has 153).

On May 1, 1949, construction of the Vihorlat Enterprise began, and production started on July 15, 1951. The construction and extension of the enterprise, which was aimed at medium heavy engineering production, created further employment opportunities in construction organisations, services and trade.

Along with the development of industry and services, housing developed. Housing estates and new family houses were constructed. The largest number of flats and family houses were built here between 1975 and 1990 for families displaced by the construction of the Starina reservoir, when the inhabitants of seven villages had to be moved out.

Demographics
According to the 2001 census, the town had 21,235 inhabitants. 86.78% of inhabitants were Slovaks, 5.84% Rusyns, 2.51% Ukrainian, 1.86% Roma and 0.58% Czechs. The religious make-up was 56.03% Roman Catholics, 19.21% Greek Catholics, 13.59% Orthodox, 5.90% people with no religious affiliation and 0.30% Lutherans.

Twin towns — sister cities

Snina is twinned with:

 Boguchwała, Poland
 Khust, Ukraine
 Kremenchuk, Ukraine
 Lesko, Poland
 Prague 4, Czech Republic
 Seferihisar, Turkey
 Tokaj, Hungary
 Žarošice, Czech Republic

Surroundings
It is a protected natural formation which dominates the southern sky-line. This rock formation consists of two andesite blocks. The nearby surroundings abound in rare endemic flora. Marked trails from Snina lead to the top.

Morské oko is a lake located in the Vihorlat Mountains in the east of Slovakia.

Beautiful wooden churches can be found in several villages of the Snina region: Ruský Potok, Uličské Krivé, Kalná Roztoka, Topoľa and Hrabová Roztoka.

On Magurica Mountain, there is a broadcasting tower of non-standard design. It is a 104 metres tall lattice tower with hexagonal cross section.

See also
 List of municipalities and towns in Slovakia

References

External links
 
 

Cities and towns in Slovakia
Villages and municipalities in Snina District